Frankie Artus (born 27 September 1988) is an English professional footballer who plays as a midfielder for Bristol Manor Farm.

He has previously played for Bristol City, Exeter City, Brentford, Kettering Town, Chesterfield, Cheltenham Town, Grimsby Town, Hereford United and Bath City.

Playing career

Bristol City
Artus began his career as a schoolboy with the Bristol City academy from the age of seven. He was contracted to Bristol City from 2006 having agreed a professional contract, but did not play a first team game in the four years he was there. He was included amongst the five replacements to face Premier League side Middlesbrough in the FA Cup and then again in the replay between the two sides. On 3 August 2007, it was announced that Artus would spend a month on loan at Conference National side Exeter City. The following season, he joined Brentford on loan for an initial one-month period and made his Football League debut coming on as a substitute against Dagenham & Redbridge.

In January 2009 he was loaned out to Kettering Town until early March and upon his return he was then loaned out again this time to Cheltenham Town. Artus scored on his Cheltenham debut on 24 March 2009 in a 1–1 draw with Oldham Athletic.

He re-joined Cheltenham on a month loan in August 2009. After making four appearances he returned to Bristol City due to injury. On 16 October 2009 he re-joined for a third time again for a month. He returned to Bristol in late December 2009 and was included in the squad for the 2–2 home draw to Watford on 28 December.

In January 2010 he joined Chesterfield on a one-month loan deal.

Cheltenham Town
He subsequently signed a one-year contract with League Two club Cheltenham Town in July 2010.

On 9 May 2011, Artus was released from Cheltenham after his contract expired.

Grimsby Town

On 5 July 2011, Artus signed for Grimsby Town. Artus scored the 2nd goal of the game against Telford United on 28 January 2012, Andi Thanoj cut inside the box and found Artus who slotted the ball into the bottom right corner to secure a 2–0 win for Grimsby.

He signed a 1-year contract extension with the club just after the 2011–2012 season had finished. Artus scored his first goal of the season for Grimsby on 27 August 2012 against Mansfield Town, scoring the opening goal of the game on 35 minutes, a good passing move from Andy Cook to release Joe Colbeck down the wing passing to Derek Niven in turn with a one touch pass to Artus who unleashed an unstoppable curling effort from 20 yards which found the top left corner, the game finishing 4–1 to the Mariners. Artus was released on 2 May 2013.

Hereford United

In July 2013 Artus joined Hereford United on trial. He agreed a one-year contract with Hereford United on 31 July 2013.

Bath City
In June 2014 Artus signed for Bath City. After seven seasons with the club, Artus departed in June 2021.

Swindon Supermarine
On 25 June 2021, Artus signed for Swindon Supermarine.

Bristol Manor Farm

On 17 November 2022, Artus signed for Bristol Manor Farm as a free agent from Swindon Supermarine.

Personal life
Artus has been a supporter of Bristol City football club since he was a child, having watched games since the age of six, through his youth academy years.

Style of play
A statement Artus made previously back in 2006 before signing professional terms at Bristol City said "I can play as an attacking midfielder or a defensive one. I still want to add more goals to my game, even though I netted a few earlier this season."

Career statistics

References

External links
Frankie Artus profile at bcfc.co.uk

1988 births
Living people
English footballers
National League (English football) players
English Football League players
Association football midfielders
Bristol City F.C. players
Exeter City F.C. players
Brentford F.C. players
Kettering Town F.C. players
Cheltenham Town F.C. players
Chesterfield F.C. players
Grimsby Town F.C. players
Hereford United F.C. players
Bath City F.C. players
Swindon Supermarine F.C. players
Footballers from Bristol